Littleworth may refer to several places in England:

Littleworth, Aylesbury Vale, Buckinghamshire
Littleworth, South Bucks, Buckinghamshire
Littleworth, Minchinhampton, Gloucestershire, a location
Littleworth, Chipping Campden, Gloucestershire, a location
Littleworth, South Oxfordshire, Oxfordshire
Littleworth, Vale of White Horse, Oxfordshire
Littleworth, Cannock, Staffordshire
Littleworth, Stafford, Staffordshire
Littleworth, a place in Woodseaves, Stafford, Staffordshire, England
Littleworth, Doncaster, South Yorkshire
Littleworth, Warwickshire, a location in Norton Lindsey parish
Littleworth, West Sussex
Littleworth, Wiltshire
Littleworth, Feckenham, Worcestershire, a location
Littleworth, Worcestershire, near Worcester
Littleworth railway station (closed), Deeping St Nicholas, Lincolnshire

See also